Gaskispor was a sports club located in Gaziantep, Turkey. The club was founded in 1984.

References

 
Sport in Gaziantep
Football clubs in Turkey
Association football clubs established in 1984
1984 establishments in Turkey